Mortemer is a commune in the Seine-Maritime department in the Normandy region in northern France.

Geography
The A29 autoroute passes through the territory of the commune.

History
It was the site of the battle of Mortemer in February 1054 and was a defeat for Henry I of France when  he led an army against his vassal, William the Bastard, Duke of Normandy in 1054.

This village is possibly the source of the medieval family name of Mortimer. The nature of the family's relations confused Robert of Torigni, one of the authors of the Gesta Normannorum Ducum. He claims that Roger of Mortemer was the brother of "William, later to be Earl of Surrey". But possibly Robert missed out a generation, as he did in dealing with the family history of the Montgomerys.

Population

Places of interest
 The church of St.Martin, dating from the eighteenth century.
 Ruins of a twelfth-century Cistercian abbey.
 Ruins of the donjon of the twelfth-century castle.

See also
Communes of the Seine-Maritime department

References

Communes of Seine-Maritime